Qazan (died 1346) was khan of the Chagatai Khanate from  until his death.

Biography

Qazan was the son of Yasa'ur, a Chagatayid prince who had revolted in the 1310s. Upon his accession to the throne, he attempted to increase his power within the ulus. These measures provoked the anger of the nobility, who threw their support behind the Qara'unas Amir Qazaghan. The two went to war in 1345; Qazan defeated Qazaghan in a battle north of the Iron Gates. Defeated and wounded, Qazaghan withdrew, but Qazan decided to spend the winter at his palace at Qarshi, allowing Qazaghan to rebuild his forces. In the next year he again fought Qazan's army and this time defeated it; Qazan was killed during the battle.

Qazan's death marked the end of the effective power of the house of Chagatai within Transoxiana (except for a brief period from 1360 until 1363); the amirs seized control of the ulus and the khans ruled in name only. The next khan, Danishmendji, was a puppet of Qazaghan, who became the effective leader of the ulus.

References

Citations

Sources 

 
 

1346 deaths
Chagatai khans
14th-century monarchs in Asia
Mongol Empire Muslims
Year of birth unknown